William Cecil Campbell (born 28 June 1930) is an Irish biologist and parasitologist with United States citizenship, known for his work in discovering a novel therapy against infections caused by roundworms, for which he was jointly awarded the 2015 Nobel Prize in Physiology or Medicine. He helped to discover a class of drugs called avermectins, whose derivatives have been shown to have "extraordinary efficacy" in treating River blindness and Lymphatic filariasis, among other parasitic diseases affecting animals and humans. Campbell worked at the Merck Institute for Therapeutic Research 1957–1990, and is currently a research fellow emeritus at Drew University.

Biography 

Campbell was born in Ramelton, County Donegal, Ireland in 1930, the third son of R. J. Campbell, a farm supplier. He studied at Trinity College, Dublin with James Desmond Smyth, graduating in 1952 with first class honours in Zoology. He then attended the University of Wisconsin–Madison on a Fulbright Scholarship, earning his PhD degree in 1957 for work on the liver fluke, a parasite affecting sheep.

From 1957 to 1990 Campbell worked at Merck Institute for Therapeutic Research, and from 1984 to 1990 he was a Senior Scientist and Director with Assay Research and Development. He became a US citizen in 1964. One of his discoveries while at Merck was the fungicide thiabendazole, used to treat potato blight, historically a scourge of Ireland. Thiabendazole is also used to treat trichinosis in humans.

Campbell is best known for his work on parasitic diseases. Japanese microbiologist Satoshi Ōmura isolated and cultured many varieties of natural soil-based bacteria from the group Streptomyces. Campbell led a team at Merck in studying Ōmura's cultures and examining their effectiveness in treating parasites in domestic and farm animals. From the sample Streptomyces avermitilis, naturally produced in soil, he derived macrocyclic lactone. After further modification, it was named ivermectin (generic) or Mectizan.

In 1978, having identified a successful treatment for a type of worms affecting horses, Campbell realised that similar treatments might be useful against related types of worms that affect humans. In 1981, Merck carried out successful Phase 1 treatment trials in Senegal and France on river blindness. Taken orally, the drug paralyses and sterilises the parasitic worm that causes the illness. Merck went on to study the treatment of elephantiasis. The research of Satoshi Ōmura, William Campbell, and their co-workers created a new class of drugs for the treatment of parasites.

In 1987, Merck decided to donate Mectizan to developing countries. Campbell was instrumental in that decision. With the World Health Organization they created an "unprecedented" drug donation program, with the intention of wiping out river blindness.  an estimated 25 million people were being treated each year, in a total of 33 countries in sub-Saharan Africa, Latin America, and the Middle East. , the Carter Center independently verified that the disease had been eradicated in Colombia, Ecuador, and Mexico.

From 1990 to 2010, when he retired, Campbell was a research fellow at Drew University in Madison, N.J., where he supervised undergraduate research and taught courses in parasitology. He has written about the history of parasitology in Antarctic exploration, including the work of surgeon Edward L. Atkinson in Scott's ill-fated Terra Nova Expedition.

In 2002, Campbell was elected member of the United States National Academy of Sciences. In 2015, he and Satoshi Ōmura shared half of the 2015 Nobel Prize in Physiology or Medicine for their research on therapies against infections caused by roundworm parasites, using derivatives of avermectin. Campbell is the seventh Irish person to be awarded a Nobel Prize, including Ernest Walton who was awarded the Nobel Prize in Physics in 1951 and Samuel Beckett for Literature in 1968.

Personal life 
William C. Campbell is married to Mary Mastin Campbell.
He is a published poet and painter.
His recreational activities include table tennis and kayaking.

Awards and honours 
 1987 President of the American Society for Parasitologists
 2002 Elected to the National Academy of Sciences
 2008 ASP Distinguished Service Award from the American Society for Parasitologists
 2015 Nobel Prize in Physiology or Medicine – shared with Satoshi Ōmura and Tu Youyou (Discovery of avermectin)
 2016 Honorary Fellowship of Trinity College Dublin.
 2020 Elected a Fellow of the Royal Society
 2021 Science Foundation Ireland St Patrick's Day Science Medal

References

External links 
Research Institute for Scientists Emeriti (RISE) at Drew University 

1930 births
Living people
People from Ramelton
People educated at Campbell College
21st-century American scientists
Alumni of Trinity College Dublin
American Nobel laureates
American parasitologists
American physiologists
Drew University people
Honorary Fellows of Trinity College Dublin
Irish biochemists
Irish biologists
Irish emigrants to the United States
Irish Nobel laureates
Irish physiologists
Members of the United States National Academy of Sciences
Merck & Co. people
Nobel laureates in Physiology or Medicine
University of Wisconsin–Madison alumni
20th-century American biochemists
Fellows of the Royal Society
Presidents of the American Society of Parasitologists